Lewis is a surname in the English language. It has several independent origins.

One of the origins of the surname, in England and Wales, is from the Norman personal name Lowis, Lodovicus. This name is from the post-Classical Latin name Ludovicus, the latinized form of the Germanic name Hlūtwīg, meaning "famed battle" (hlūt meaning "loud" or "famous" and wīg meaning "battle"). The name developed into the Old French Clovis, Clouis, and Louis. The name Lowis spread to England through the Normans.

In the United Kingdom Lewis is most commonly associated with Wales, and is a common Welsh Patronym. The name developed as an Anglicised or diminutive form of native Welsh names such as Llywelyn. Among the earliest examples being the Lewis family of Glamorgan in the 1540s. Other derivations include the Gaelic surname Mac Lughaidh, meaning "son of Lughaidh", which has also been Anglicised as Lewis. The surname Lewis is also an Anglicisation of several like-sounding Jewish surnames, such as "Levy" or "Levi", and of the Arab form of the name "Elias".

Lewis is the 4th most common surname in Saint Vincent and the Grenadines, 6th most common surname in Wales, 16th most common in Jamaica, 22nd most common in England, 24th most common in the United States, 61st most common in Canada and 129th most common in Scotland.

Real people

Business
Andrea Lewis (Microsoft), early Microsoft employee
Aylwin Lewis (born 1954), American CEO
Dewi Lewis (born 1951), Welsh publisher and photographer
Essington Lewis (1881–1961), Australian businessman
J. Slater Lewis (1852–1901), English executive
Ken Lewis (executive) (born 1947), head of Bank of America
Marianne W. Lewis, Dean of the Cass Business School
Mary Jane Lewis (1852–1941), New Zealand brewery manager
Peter Lewis (businessman) (1933–2013), American businessman
Reginald Lewis (1942–1993), American businessman
Robert Benjamin Lewis (1802–1858), African-American entrepreneur
Sage Frederick Lewis (born 1971)  homelessness activist, author, and small business owner

Economics
Joe Lewis (British businessman) (born 1937), wealthy English investor
Martin Lewis (financial journalist) (born 1972), English money expert
Tracy R. Lewis, American economist
W. Arthur Lewis (1915–1991), St Lucian economist, winner of the Bank of Sweden Prize 1979

Law
Bayan Lewis (born 1942), Los Angeles police chief
George Henry Lewis (1833–1911), English lawyer of Jewish extraction
James W. Lewis, American convicted in relation to the 1982 Tylenol scare
Johnnie Lewis (1946–2015), Liberian judge
R. Fred Lewis (born 1947), American judge
Terry Lewis (Queensland) (born 1928), former Queensland police commissioner
Theodore G. Lewis (1890–1934), American judge
Virginia Emerson Lewis (died 1984), American political scientist and legal scholar
William Draper Lewis (1867–1949), American legal scholar

Literature
Alfred Henry Lewis (1855–1914), editor of Chicago Times and author
Alun Lewis (1915–1944), poet of the Anglo-Welsh school
Anthony Lewis (1927–2013), American writer
Beverly Lewis (born 1949), American Christian fiction novelist and children's author
C. S. Lewis (1898–1963), Irish academic and writer
Cecil Day-Lewis (1904–1972), Irish poet
Charles Lewis (journalist) (born 1953), founder of the Center for Public Integrity
D. B. Wyndham-Lewis (1891–1969), British columnist and literary editor
Edna Lewis (1916–2006), American cook and writer
Edward Gardner Lewis (1869–1950), American publisher
Eiluned Lewis (1900–1979), Welsh writer
Hilda Lewis (1896–1974), British writer
Janet Lewis (1899–1998), American writer
Janet Cook Lewis (1855-1947), American librarian and book repairer
Linda Lewis (author), British author
Matthew Gregory Lewis (1775–1818), British Gothic novelist
Michael Lewis (born 1960), American non-fiction author
Miles Marshall Lewis (born 1970), American writer
Naomi Lewis (1911–2009), British poet and children's writer
Richard W. Lewis (1917–2002), literary critic and biographer
Roger Lewis (born 1960), British biographer
Saunders Lewis (1893–1985), Welsh writer
Sinclair Lewis (1885–1951), American novelist
Ted Lewis (writer) (1940–1982), English crime novelist
Titus Lewis (1773–1811), Welsh Calvinist and writer
Warren Lewis (1895–1973), brother of C. S. Lewis
Wendy Lewis (born 1962), Australian author
Wyndham Lewis (1882–1957), American-British modernist artist and writer

Military and naval
Andrew Lewis (soldier) (1720–1781), Virginia general
Isaac Newton Lewis (1858–1931), American soldier and inventor of the Lewis Gun
Jack H. Lewis, United States Navy submarine commander in World War II
Joseph Horace Lewis (1824–1904), Confederate Brigadier General
Michael Lewis (naval historian) (1890–1970), Professor at the Royal Naval College, Greenwich
Milton Lewis (1920–1942), United States Marine Corps recipient of the Navy Cross
Robert A. Lewis (1917–1983), co-pilot on the Enola Gay that dropped the atomic bomb on Hiroshima
Robert Patrick Lewis, former Green Beret and 1st Amendment Praetorian co-founder
William Gaston Lewis (1835–1901), Confederate General

Modelling
Ananda Lewis (born 1973), American model
Damaris Lewis (born 1990), American model/dancer
Denice D. Lewis (born 1960), American model and actor
Donny Lewis (born 1976), American model
Nancy Lewis, American female bodybuilder

Music
Aaron Lewis (born 1972), American singer
Andrew Lewis (composer) (born 1963), English composer of acousmatic music
Andy Lewis (bassist) (1966–2000), Australian musician
Ann Lewis (born 1956), Japanese singer
Archie Lewis (1918–1988), Jamaican singer
Barbara Lewis (born 1943), American singer
Blake Lewis (born 1981), Season six on American Idol
Bob Lewis (musician) (born 1947), musician
Bobby Lewis (1925–2020), American R&B singer
Charles D. Lewis (born 1955), Barbadian bassist, singer-songwriter, producer
Courtney Lewis (conductor) (born 1984), British conductor
C.J. Lewis (born 1967) British reggae singer
Donna Lewis (born 1973), Welsh singer-songwriter
Edward Lewis (Decca) (1900–1980), founder of Decca Records
Edythe Lewis (1924–2014), American DJ and politician
Ephraim Lewis (1967–1994), English soul and R&B singer and songwriter
Furry Lewis (1893–1981), American blues guitarist
Gary Lewis (musician) (born 1946), American musician
George Lewis (clarinetist) (1900–1968), New Orleans jazz musician
George E. Lewis (born 1952), jazz trombone player and composer
Glenn Lewis (born 1975), Canadian singer
Herbie Lewis (1941–2007), American jazz bassist
Huey Lewis (born 1950), American musician and singer
Jayce Lewis (born 1984), Welsh Musician/Solo Artist
Jeannie Lewis (born 1945), Australian musician
Jeffrey Lewis (born 1975), American singer/songwriter
Jenny Lewis (born 1976 or 1977), American singer
Jerry Lee Lewis (1935–2022), American rock and roll singer, songwriter, and pianist
John Lewis (pianist) (1920–2001), the jazz pianist
Jon Peter Lewis (born 1979), American singer
Jona Lewie (born 1947), English singer
Josh Lewis (guitarist) (born 1967), American guitarist
Laurie Lewis (born 1950), American bluegrass musician
Leona Lewis (born 1985), English singer
Linda Lewis (born 1950), British singer
Linda Gail Lewis (born 1947), American musician
Lori Lewis (born 1972), American opera singer
Mary Lewis (soprano) (1900-1941), American soprano and actress
Meade Lux Lewis (1905–1964), American pianist and composer
Mel Lewis (1929–1990), American jazz drummer
Mike Lewis (musician) (born 1977), Welsh guitarist for Lostprophets
Morgan Lewis (songwriter) (1906–1968), songwriter
Noah Lewis (1891–1961), American jug band musician
Oliver Lewis (violinist) (born 1971), British violinist
Olivia Lewis (born 1978), Maltese singer
Peter Scott Lewis (born 1953), American composer
Phil Lewis (born 1957), English-American singer
Ramsey Lewis (1935–2022), American jazz pianist and composer
Ray Lewis (singer), singer for The Drifters
Richard Lewis (tenor) (1914–1990), English tenor
Ryan Lewis (DJ) (born 1988), producer, frequent collaborator with Macklemore and part of Macklemore & Ryan Lewis
Sarah-Jane Lewis (born 1987), English soprano
Shaznay Lewis (born 1975), English singer-songwriter
Smiley Lewis (1913–1966), musician
Steve Lewis (musician) (1896 – c. 1941), American jazz pianist
Ted Lewis (musician) (1890–1971), American band leader
Terence Lewis (choreographer) (born 1975), Indian dancer and choreographer
Tom Lewis (songwriter) (born 1943), Canadian folksinger/songwriter
Yvonne John Lewis, English singer

Philosophy
Clarence Irving Lewis (1883–1964), philosopher and mathematical logician
David Lewis (philosopher) (1941–2001), American philosopher
Hywel David Lewis (1910–1992), Welsh philosopher and theologian
Michael Lewis (philosopher) (born 1977), British philosopher

Politics
Andrew L. Lewis Jr. (1931–2016), American politician
Anna Lewis (suffragette) (1899–1976), British suffragette, recipient of Hunger Strike Medal
Arthur Lewis (English politician) (1917–1998), MP for Newham, North West
B. Robert Lewis (1931–1979), American veterinarian and politician
Burton B. Lewis (1856–1938), American cheese manufacturer and politician
Clive Derby-Lewis (1936–2016), South African politician
Daurene Lewis (1943–2013), Canadian politician
David Lewis (Canadian politician) (1909–1981), Russian-born Canadian lawyer and politician
David P. Lewis (1820–1884), American politician
David R. Lewis (born 1971), American politician
Dixon Hall Lewis (1802–1848), American politician
Doug Lewis (born 1938), Canadian politician
Drew Lewis (1931-2016) American, U.S. Secretary of Transportation
Edmund H. Lewis (1884–1972), Chief Judge of the NY Court of Appeals 1953–1954
Elliott Lewis (politician) (1858–1935), Australian politician
Elisha Lewis (died 1867), American politician
Eugene Lewis (born c. 1940), American political scientist
Evan Lewis (politician) (1869–1941), American politician
Fielding Lewis (1725–1781), brother-in-law of George Washington
Francis Lewis (1713–1802), American merchant and politician
Fred E. Lewis (1865–1949), US Congressman from Pennsylvania and Mayor of Allentown, Pennsylvania
Geordin Hill-Lewis (Born 1986), Mayor of Cape Town
George Cornewall Lewis (1806–1863), British statesman
J. Hamilton Lewis (1863–1939), American politician
Helmar Lewis (1900–1999), American politician
Herbert Lewis (1858–1933), British politician
Ivan Lewis (born 1967), British politician
James A. Lewis (politician) (1933–1997), American libertarian politician
James T. Lewis (1819–1904), politician
Jerry Lewis (California politician) (1934–2021), American politician
John Lewis (1940–2020), American civil rights activist and politician
John Bower Lewis (1817–1874), Canadian politician
John F. Lewis (1818–1895), American farmer and politician
John Wood Lewis Sr. (1801–1865), American politician
Joseph J. Lewis (1801–1883), American Commissioner of Internal Revenue
JT Lewis (born 2000), American political candidate
Julian Lewis (born 1951), British politician
Kenneth Lewis (1916–1997), British politician
Kimmi Lewis (1957–2019), American politician
Leslyn Lewis (born 1970 or 1971), Canadian politician
Loran L. Lewis (1825–1916), New York politician and judge
Louie E. Lewis (1893–1968), Illinois politician
Marilyn Lewis (1931–2020), American politician
Mary Parker Lewis, American political consultant and activist
Merton E. Lewis (1861–1937), NY State Attorney General 1917–1918
Morgan Lewis (governor) (1754–1844), Governor of New York State
Mungo Lewis (1894–1969), Canadian politician
Oswald Lewis (1887–1966), British businessman, barrister and politician
Peter Lewis (politician) (1942–2017), Australian politician
Richard Lewis (New Zealand politician) (born 1969), New Zealand politician
Ron Lewis (born 1946), American politician
Sandy Lewis (1931–2016), Australian politician
J. E. Stanley Lewis (1888–1970), Canadian politician
Stephen Lewis (born 1937), Canadian politician, son of David Lewis (politician)
Terry Lewis (politician) (born 1935), British politician
Thomas Lewis (NSW) (1922–2016), Australian politician
Thomas Lewis Jr. (1760–1847), U.S. Congressman from Virginia
Tommy Lewis (trade unionist) (1873–1962), British trade unionist and Labour MP
Tryon D. Lewis (born 1947), Texas politician
Vaughan Lewis (born 1940), St. Lucian politician
William Berkeley Lewis (1784–1866), American politician
William Mather Lewis (1878–1945), American teacher, university president, local politician, and a state and national government official.

Religion
Christopher Andrew Lewis (born 1944), British academic and clergyman
Saint David Lewis (1616–1679), one of the Forty Martyrs of England and Wales
David Lewis (1839–1901), Anglican priest and Archdeacon of Carmarthen
Edwin Lewis (1881–1959), American Methodist theologian
Harvey Spencer Lewis (1883–1939), American Rosicrucian
John Lewis (philosopher) (1889–1976), British philosopher and religious leader
Joseph Lewis (freethinker) (1889–1968), freethinker and atheist
Oswald Lewis (bishop) (born 1944), Indian Roman Catholic bishop
Ralph Maxwell Lewis (1904–1987), American Rosicrucian
Row Lewis, Grenadian Director of the Liberty Fellowship Center
Ruth Lewis (died 2020), Pakistani Roman Catholic nun
Sharma Lewis, African American United Methodist bishop

Science
Adrian Lewis (mathematician) (born 1962), British-Canadian mathematician
Bennett Lewis (1908–1987), Canadian physicist
Bunnell Lewis (1824–1908), English archaeologist
Carenza Lewis (born 1963), archaeologist
Edward B. Lewis (1918–2004), American geneticist
George W. Lewis (1882–1948), director of NACA
Georgina King Lewis (1847–1924), English philanthropist
Gilbert N. Lewis (1875–1946), American physical chemist
Glyn Lewis, British professor of psychiatric epidemiology
Graceanna Lewis (1821–1912), American naturalist and anti-slavery activist
Gwilym Peter Lewis (born 1952), British botanist
Harlan Lewis (1919–2008), American botanist 
Henry Carvill Lewis (1853–1888), American geologist
Jack Lewis, Baron Lewis of Newnham (1928–2014), English chemist
John S. Lewis (born 1941), American professor of planetary science at the University of Arizona
Jonathan Lewis (oncologist), biomedical researcher, cancer drug developer
Margaret Reed Lewis (1881–1970), American cell biologist and embryologist
Marion Lewis (born 1925), Canadian medical researcher and professor of medicine
Paul A. Lewis (1879–1929), American pathologist
Stephen J. Lewis, British gastroenterologist; development of the Bristol Stool Chart
Trevor Lewis (entomologist) (born 1933), British entomologist
Warren Harmon Lewis (1870–1964), American cell biologist and embryologist

Sports
Lewis (baseball), baseball player
Adrian Lewis (born 1985), English darts player
Ady Lewis (born 1975), English boxer who fought in the 1990s and 2000s
Alan Lewis (born 1964), Irish cricketer and rugby union referee
Allan Lewis (baseball) (born 1941), Panamanian professional baseball player
Ashton Lewis Jr. (born 1972), American driver
Becky Lewis (born 1983 or 1984), British long-distance swimmer
Bernie Lewis (born 1945), Welsh footballer
Bill Lewis (football) (born 1941), American football coach
Billy Lewis (footballer, born 1864) (1864–1935), Welsh international footballer
Brad Alan Lewis (born 1954), American rower
Brian M. Lewis (born 1974), American athlete
Bryn Lewis (1891–1917), Wales international rugby union footballer
Cam Lewis (born 1997), American football player
Carl Lewis (born 1961), American Olympic athlete
Chad Lewis (born 1971), American football player
Chavaughn Lewis (born 1993), American basketball player for Hapoel Galil Elyon of the Israeli Basketball Premier League
Charles Lewis (footballer) (1886–1967), English football player
Chris Lewis (cricketer) (born 1968), England international and county cricketer
Chris Lewis (tennis player) (born 1957), New Zealand tennis player
Colby Lewis (born 1979), American baseball player
Corey Lewis (racing driver) (born 1991), American racing driver
D. D. Lewis (linebacker, born 1945), retired American football player
D. D. Lewis (linebacker, born 1979), active American football player
Dai Lewis (1866–1943), Wales international rugby union footballer
Dale Lewis (footballer) (born 1969), Australian Rules footballer
Dan Lewis (footballer) (1902–1965), Welsh football player
Daniel Lewis (volleyball) (born 1976), Canadian volleyball player
Darren Lewis (born 1967), American baseball player
Darryl Lewis (born 1961), American football player
Darryll Lewis (born 1968), American football player
Dave Lewis (linebacker) (1954–2020), retired National Football League linebacker
Dave Lewis (hockey) (born 1953), Canadian hockey coach
Denise Lewis (born 1972), British heptathlete
Desmond Lewis (1946–2018), Jamaican cricketer
Donnie Lewis (born 1997), American football player
Duffy Lewis (1888–1979), American baseball player
Ed Lewis (wrestler) (1891–1966), American wrestler
Eddie Lewis (American soccer player) (born 1974), American football (soccer) player
Eddie Lewis (English footballer) (1935–2011), English football (soccer) player
Edward John Lewis (1859–1925), Wales international rugby union footballer
Eldece Clarke-Lewis (born 1965), Bahamian runner
Evin Lewis (born 1991), Trinidadian cricketer
Fred Lewis (born 1980), American baseball player
Fred Lewis (handball) (born 1947), American handball player
Geno Lewis (born 1993), American (college) football player
Geoff Lewis (born 1935), Welsh retired jockey
George Lewis (rugby), rugby union and rugby league footballer of the 1920s and 1930s for Pontypool RFC (RU), for Wales (RL), and St. Helens
George Lewis (rugby league), rugby league footballer of the 1920s, 1930s and 1940s for Castleford
Grant Lewis (born 1985), American NHL ice hockey player
Greg Lewis (wide receiver) (born 1980), American football player
Guy Lewis (1922–2015), American basketball coach
Harry Lewis (boxer) (1886–1956), American boxer
Haydn Lewis (born 1986), Barbadian tennis player
Hayley Lewis (born 1974), Australian swimmer
Herbie Lewis (ice hockey) (1906–1991), Canadian hockey player
Jackie Lewis (born 1936), British racing driver
Jamal Lewis (American football) (born 1979), American football player
Jamal Lewis (footballer) (born 1998), Northern Irish footballer
Jamie Lewis (born 1991), Welsh darts player
Jensen Lewis (born 1984), American baseball player
Jim Lewis (racehorse owner), owner of racehorse Best Mate
Jim Lewis (1980s pitcher) (born 1955), American baseball player
Jimi Lewis (born 1974), English hockey player
Joe Lewis (footballer) (born 1987), English footballer
John Henry Lewis (1914–1974), boxer
Jon Lewis (born 1975), English cricketer
Jonathan Lewis (soccer) (born 1997), American soccer player
Jourdan Lewis (born 1995), American football player
Kahlil Lewis (born 1997), American football player
Kevin Lewis (American football) (born 1978), American football linebacker
Kira Lewis (born 2001), American basketball player
Kirstin Jean Lewis (born 1975), South African archer
Kyle Lewis (born 1995), American baseball player
Lennox Lewis (born 1965), English boxer
Leo Lewis (1933–2013), American football player
Lesa Lewis (born 1967), American IFBB professional bodybuilder
Lionel Lewis (born 1982), Singaporean footballer
Luke Lewis (born 1983), Australian rugby league player
M. Lewis, Surrey cricketer
Maia Lewis (born 1970), New Zealand cricketer
Marcedes Lewis (born 1984), American football player
Mark Lewis (Arena Football League) (born 1979), American football player
Mark Lewis (baseball) (born 1969), American baseball player
Mark Lewis-Francis (born 1982), British athlete
Martin Lewis (basketball) (born 1975), American basketball player
Martyn Lewis (badminton) (born 1982), British badminton player
Marvin Lewis (born 1958), American football coach
Mick Lewis (born 1974), Australian cricketer
Michael Lewis (safety) (born 1980), American Football player for the San Francisco 49ers
Michael Lewis (wide receiver) (born 1971), American Football player for the New Orleans Saints
Mo Lewis (born 1969), American football player
Norman Lewis (fencer) (1915–2006), American Olympic fencer
Oliver Lewis (1856–1924), American jockey
Olivia Lewis (born 1999), Australian netballer
Osia Lewis (born 1962), American football player
Oswald Lewis (cricketer) (1833–1895), Australian cricketer
Panama Lewis (1945–2020), American boxing trainer
Patrick Lewis (born 1991), American football player
Percy "Plum" Lewis (1884–1976), South African cricketer
Percy Lewis (1864–1922), Australian cricketer
Percy Lewis (1927–2019), Trinidad and Tobago/British boxer who fought in the 1950s and 1960s 
Rashard Lewis (born 1979), American basketball player
Rawl Lewis (born 1974), Grenadian cricketer
Ray Lewis (American football) (born 1975), American football player
Ray Lewis (runner) (1910–2003), Canadian athlete
Rico Lewis (born 2004), English footballer 
Reg Lewis (1920–1997), English footballer
Reggie Lewis (1965–1993), American basketball player
Reginald Lewis (cricketer) (1927–1981), South African cricketer
Ricky Lewis (born 1982), American soccer player
Robert B. Lewis (1924–2006), Thoroughbred racehorse owner
Roderick Lewis (born 1971), American football player
Royce Lewis (born 1999), American baseball player
Scott Lewis (left-handed pitcher) (born 1983), American baseball player
Sian Lewis (born 1976), British pentathlete
Stacy Lewis (born 1985), American golfer
Steve Lewis (athlete) (born 1969), American athlete
Stuart Lewis-Evans (1930–1958), British Formula One driver
Tamsyn Lewis (born 1978), Australian athlete
Ted "Kid" Lewis (Gershon Mendeloff) (1893–1970), English world champion Hall of Fame welterweight boxer
Thomas Lewis (football) (born 1972), American football wide receiver in the NFL
Tim Lewis (born 1961), American football player
Thyron Lewis (born 1982), American football player
Tommylee Lewis (born 1992), American football player
Tony Lewis (born 1938), Welsh cricketer
Trevor Lewis (born 1987), American hockey player
Trey Lewis (American football) (born 1985), American NFL defensive tackle
Trey Lewis (basketball) (born 1992), American basketball player in the Israeli Basketball Premier League
Tyquan Lewis (born 1995), American football player
Vernon Lewis (American football) (born 1970), American football player
Vernon Lewis (footballer) (1881–1941), English footballer
Wally Lewis (born 1959), Australian rugby league player
Wilf Lewis (1903–1976), Welsh international footballer

Television and film
Al Lewis (actor) (1923–2006), American actor
Andrea Lewis (born 1985), Canadian actress
Avi Lewis (born 1968), Canadian television journalist and documentary filmmaker, son of Stephen Lewis
Charlotte Lewis (born 1967), English actress
Chauntal Lewis (born 1984), American actress
Damian Lewis (born 1971), English actor
Dan Lewis (newsreader) (born 1949), Seattle-based Newsreader
Daniel Day-Lewis (born 1957), English actor
David Lewis (actor) (1916–2000), American actor
Dawnn Lewis (born 1961), American actress
Diana Lewis (1919–1997), American Actress
Emmanuel Lewis (born 1971), American actor
Francine Lewis, a British actress, model, television presenter and impressionist
Forrest Lewis (1899–1977), American actor
Gary Lewis (actor) (born 1957), Scottish actor
Geoffrey Lewis (actor) (1935–2015), American actor
George Lewis (journalist) (born 1943), broadcast journalist at NBC News
Harry Lewis (actor) (1920–2013), actor
Herschell Gordon Lewis (1926–2016), American film director
Howard Lew Lewis (1941–2018), English actor and comedian
Ida Lewis (1842–1911), Canadian actress
Jason Lewis (born 1971), American actor
Jenifer Lewis (born 1957), American actress
Jerry Lewis (1926–2017), American comedian, actor, screenwriter, and director
Johnny Lewis (1983–2012), American actor
Joseph Lewis (1907–2000), American film director
Judy Lewis (1935–2011), American actress
Juliette Lewis (born 1973), American actress
Martin Lewis (humorist) (born 1952), English humorist/producer/writer/TV host
Martyn Lewis (journalist) (born 1945), British newsreader
Mary Jane Lewis, married name of Mary Jane Croft (1916–1999), American actress
Matthew Lewis (actor) (born 1989), English actor
Phill Lewis (born 1968), American actor
Richard Lewis (comedian) (born 1947), American comedian and actor
Richard J. Lewis, TV and film director
Robert Lewis (actor) (1909–1997), American actor
Robert Q. Lewis (1920–1991), American actor and game show host
Sharon Lewis, Canadian television personality
Stephen Lewis (actor) (1926–2015), English actor
Tamasin Day-Lewis (born 1953), English television chef
Ted Lewis (voice actor), voice actor
Terence Lewis (choreographer) (born 1975), Indian dancer and choreographer
Vicki Lewis (born 1960), American actress
Victor Lewis-Smith, British TV critic and humorist

Theater
Shari Lewis (1933–1998), American puppeteer

Visual art
Bill Lewis (born 1953), English artist
Corey Lewis, American comics artist
Edmonia Lewis (1844–1907), American sculptor
Ivor Lewis (1882–1958), Canadian sculptor
Martin Lewis (1881–1962), Australian artist
Maud Lewis (1903–1970), Canadian artist
Nate Lewis (born 1985), American artist
Neville Lewis (1895–1972), South African artist
Tau Lewis (born 1993), Canadian artist

Other
Anna Lewis (1885–1961), American historian
Bernard Lewis (1916–2018), English historian
Damien Lewis (disambiguation), multiple people
Doris E. Lewis (1911-1988), Canadian librarian
Lady Davina Lewis (born 1977), minor British Royal
Dorothy Otnow Lewis, American psychiatrist
Dorothy Swain Lewis (1915–2013), American aviator
Earl Lewis, American academic administrator
Essington Lewis (1881–1961), Australian industrialist
Fulton Lewis (1903–1966), American radio broadcaster
Geoffrey Lewis (scholar) (1920–2008), English professor of the Turkish language
James Lewis (disambiguation), multiple people
James Paul Lewis Jr., American Ponzi schemer
Joel W. Lewis, American abolitionist and reformer
John L. Lewis (1880–1969), American labor leader'
Justin Lewis (disambiguation), multiple people
Levi Lewis (disambiguation), multiple people
Lillian A. Lewis (1861–?), American journalist
Mark Edward Lewis (born 1954), American historian of early China
Meriwether Lewis (1774–1809), American explorer and co-leader of Lewis and Clark expedition
Reina Lewis (born 1963), British art historian
Richard D. Lewis (born 1930), British linguist and cross-cultural communication consultant
Samuel L. Lewis (1896–1971), American Sufi and founder of Dances of Universal Peace
Terrell Lewis (disambiguation), multiple people
Thomas Lewis (Virginia politician) (1718–1790), American surveyor
Thomas Lewis (unionist) (1866–1939), president, United Mine Workers of America
Tom Lewis (M.D.) (1918–2004), English obstetrician
William Lewis (chess player) (1787–1870), English chess player of the 19th century
Christopher John Lewis, a New Zealand assassin.

Fictional characters
Alphie Lewis, fictional character from House of Anubis
Anne Lewis, fictional cop character in RoboCop and its first two sequels
Charlotte Lewis (Lost), fictional character from Lost
Cliff Lewis, fictional character from Matlock
Darcy Lewis, fictional character in Thor (film) & Thor: The Dark World
Edward Lewis, fictional character in Pretty Woman
Gareth Lewis, a fictional character from the British soap opera Doctors
Jerry Lewis, a fictional character from the animated television series Totally Spies
Josh and Reva Lewis, fictional characters from Guiding Light
Luke Lewis, fictional character from music business Universal
Melissa Lewis, fictional character from The Martian
Marisol Lewis, from Degrassi
Meldrick Lewis, from Homicide: Life on the Street
Parker Lewis, fictional character from Parker Lewis Can't Lose
Robbie Lewis, fictional character in Inspector Morse and Inspector Lewis
Shelley Lewis, fictional character from EastEnders
Simon Lewis, fictional character from The Mortal Instruments (series)
Susan Lewis (ER), fictional character from ER
Tara Lewis, protagonist of Criminal Minds
Tony Lewis, fictional character from The Tenth Kingdom
Vanessa Lewis, fictional character from Virtua Fighter

See also
Lewis (given name)
Lewis (disambiguation)

References

English-language surnames
Jewish surnames
Surnames of Norman origin
Surnames of Welsh origin
Germanic-language surnames
Levite surnames
Anglicised Welsh-language surnames